Rasmus Thrane Hansen is a Danish orienteering competitor. At the World Games in 2013 he placed fourth in the middle distance, and won a silver medal in the mixed relay with the Danish team.

References

External links

Year of birth missing (living people)
Living people
Danish orienteers
Male orienteers
Foot orienteers
World Games silver medalists

Competitors at the 2013 World Games
World Games medalists in orienteering